This is the list of notable people from Jammu and Kashmir.

Academics, science and technology

 Ved Kumari Ghai, Padma Shri and Nari Shakti Puraskar recipient, eminent Sanskrit Scholar and renowned social worker
 Lalit Gupta, art historian
 Subhash Kak, American computer scientist
 Vijay Mahajan, American Marketing Professor from Jammu
 Amitabh Mattoo, thinker and professor
 Vishwamurti Shastri, Sanskrit scholar
 Sonam Wangchuk, engineer, innovator and education reformist
 G. M. Bhat, geologist and professor.

Administration and police 

 Masud Choudhary, ex IPS officer
 Shah Faesal, first IAS topper from Kashmir
 V. N. Kaul, Comptroller and Auditor General of India, Padma Bhushan
 Abdul Rashid Khan, IPS, Ex Inspector General of Police and Member State Human Rights Commission.
 Farooq Khan, ex IPS, politician, advisor
 Kewal Kumar Sharma,ex IAS officer and advisor to Governor
 Shesh Paul Vaid, IPS officer

Artists

 Aamir Bashir, actor
 Rahul Bhat, actor
 Mudasir Rehman Dar, sketch artist
 MC Kash, rapper and singer
 KRSNA, rapper and actor
 KSHMR, EDM artist
 Baabarr Mudacer, singer and rapper 
 Malika Pukhraj, singer
 Alla Rakha, musician
 Ghulam Rasool Santosh, painter
 Vibha Saraf, singer & musician
 Mir Sarwar, actor
 Kanish Sharma, music director and singer
 Pandit Shivkumar Sharma, musician
 Bhajan Sopori, musician
 Dina Nath Walli, painter

Defence forces 

 Ajay Singh Jasrotia, Sena Medal recipient, Kargil War
 Chewang Rinchen, double MVC recipient
 Bana Singh, PVC recipient
 General Bikram Singh, ex Chief of Army Staff
 Rajinder Singh, first MVC recipient
 Nirmal Chander Vij, ex Chief of Army Staff
 Nazir Ahmad Wani, first Ashoka Chakra recipient

Films and television 

 Anjali Abrol, film actress
 Raj Singh Arora, TV actor
 Praneet Bhat, actor
 Vidhu Vinod Chopra
 Aditya Dhar, film director & lyricist
 Sandeepa Dhar, actress
 Zain Khan Durrani actor, poet
 Sana Dua, model	
 Aly Goni, TV actor
 Sidhant Gupta, actor
 Jeevan, actor
 Mushtaq Kak, actor and theatre director
 Sanjay Kak, documentary film maker
 Siddharth Kak, television producer and presenter
 Ekta Kaul, TV actress
 Kanchi Kaul, actress
 Sumit Kaul, actor
 Hina Khan, TV actress
 Mohammed Iqbal Khan, actor
 Mushtaq Khan actor, writer, producer
 Kunal Khemu, actor
 Anupam Kher, actor
 Kiran Kumar, actor
 Raaj Kumar, film actor 
 Reyhna Malhotra, TV actress
 Leenesh Mattoo, TV actor
 Wasim Mushtaq, TV actor
 Om Prakash, character actor
 Abrar Qazi, actor
 K. K. Raina, actor, director
 M. K. Raina, actor, theatre director
 Mohit Raina, actor
 Priya Raina, actor, singer, voice artist 
 Mukesh Rishi, actor
 Vineet Raina, actor
 K. L. Saigal, singer and actor
 Tej Sapru, actor
 Vinay Sapru, actor, writer, director
 Mir Sarwar, actor, former model
 Loveleen Kaur Sasan, TV serial actress
 Kanish Sharma, music director
 Nitin Sharma, model
 Shaheer Sheikh, TV actor
 Sunder, actor
 Sanjay Suri, actor
 Qazi Touqeer, singer
 Zaira Wasim, former film actress
 Rajendranath Zutshi, film actor

Journalism & media 

 Shujaat Bukhari
 Sajjad Haider, journalist and editor of Kashmir Observer
 Yusuf Jameel, veteran Kashmiri journalist known for his coverage of Kashmir conflict.
 Altaf Qadri, photojournalist working with the Associated Press.
 Nidhi Razdan, newscaster
 Qazi Shibli, journalist and editor of The Kashmiryat.
 Asif Sultan, journalist and editor in chief of Kashmir Narrator
 Kamran Yousuf, photojournalist
 Masrat Zahra, freelance photojournalist.

Law and justice 

 Adarsh Sein Anand, ex Chief Justice of India
 Parvez Imroz, human rights activist and lawyer
 Mehr Chand Mahajan, ex Chief Justice of India
 Bilal Nazki, ex Chief Justice of Orissa and Chairman of Human Rights Commission of Bihar
 T. S. Thakur, ex Chief Justice of India

Literature 

 Agha Shahid Ali, poet and finalist for National Book Award of United States in 2001
 Rafiq Anjum, poet, researcher, poet and critic of Prof. Rahman Rahi
 Bashir Bhadarwahi, writer, educationist, poet
 Moti Lal Kemmu, Kashmiri writer and social worker
 Habba Khatun, 16th-century poet, known as "Nightingale of Kashmir"
 Lalleshwari, poet-saint
 Hakeem Manzoor, writer, poet
 Farooq Nazki, poet, broadcaster and media personality
 Basharat Peer, author and scriptwriter
 Padma Sachdev, poet, novelist, first modern women poet of Dogri language
 Ali Mohammad Shahbaz, writer, poet
 Deen Bandhu Sharma, writer
 Nilamber Dev Sharma, first publication in English about Dogri literature
 Ram Nath Shastri, known as "Father of Dogri" as he brought Dogri language at national level, Dogri poet
 Jitendra Udhampuri, writer

Politics 

 Farooq Abdullah, former Chief Minister of Jammu and Kashmir
 Omar Abdullah, former Chief Minister of Jammu and Kashmir
 Sheikh Abdullah, former Chief Minister of Jammu and Kashmir.
 Ghulam Nabi Azad, former Chief Minister of Jammu and Kashmir
 Mirza Afzal Beg (d.1982) was the first Deputy Chief Minister of Jammu and Kashmir
 Mirza Mehboob Beg (1949-), politician. He is Former Member of Parliament from Anantnag
 Altaf Bukhari, former Finance Minister of Jammu and Kashmir
 Prem Nath Dogra, founder of Praja Parishad Party
 Shah Faesal, Independent politician, founder of Jammu and Kashmir Peoples Movement.
 Peer Mohammed Hussain, former Minister of State and co founder of Jammu and Kashmir Peoples Democratic Party
 Syed Mir Qasim, former Chief Minister of Jammu and Kashmir
 Bakshi Ghulam Mohammad, former Prime Minister of Jammu and Kashmir
 Mehbooba Mufti, former Chief Minister of Jammu and Kashmir
 Mufti Mohammad Sayeed, former Chief Minister of Jammu and Kashmir. and former Home Minister of India
 Karan Singh, ex Sadar-e-Raiyasat

Religion 

 Banda Singh Bahadur
 Rahmatullah Mir Qasmi
 Showkat Ahmed Shah
 Mohammad Anwar Shopiani
 Faizul Waheed

Royalty 

* Gulab Singh, Maharaja
 Hari Singh, Maharaja
 Karan Singh, Maharaja
 Pratap Singh, Maharaja
 Ranbir Singh Maharaja

Social Activists 

* Parveena Ahanger, cofounder and chairman of the Association of Parents of Disappeared Persons (APDP)
 Mushtaq Pahalgami, social activist, environmentalist

Sports 

 Ishfaq Ahmed, Indian football team
 Danish Farooq Bhat, Indian footballer plays as midfielder for real Kashmir team
 Manzoor Dar, Indian cricketer
 Gul Dev, Winter Olympian
 Nadeem Iqbal, Winter Olympian
 Ranveer Jamwal, mountaineer, climbed Everest 3 times, has climbed the highest peaks of all 7 continents
 Shubham Khajuria, cricketer
 Arif Khan, Winter Olympian
 Umran Malik, J&K cricketer, played IPL through Sunrisers Hyderabad
 Mithun Manhas, Indian Premier League player
 Aadil Manzoor Peer, International ice stock sport athlete, web Developer
 Samay Raina, Chess Player, YouTuber, Streamer
 Iqra Rasool, Indian cricketer
 Parvez Rasool, first J&K cricketer to represent India in International cricket
 Rasikh Salam, Indian Premier League player
 Abdul Samad, J&K cricketer, played IPL through Sunrisers Hyderabad
 Chain Singh, J&K's first Olympian, Asian Games 2014 Bronze Medal winner in shooting
 Mehrajuddin Wadoo, Indian Football team

See also 	
 List of Kashmiri people	
 List of Indians by state

Jammu and Kashmir
People